Lucia Ondrušová (born 10 May 1988) is a former Slovak football midfielder, who last played for Sparta Prague in the Czech Women's First League.

Career
Ondrušová previously played for Hellas Verona, and she has also played for PVFA Bratislava and Slovan Bratislava in the Slovak First League, Sparta Prague and Bohemians Prague in the Czech Women's First League, FC Neunkirch, FC Basel
 in the Nationalliga A and 1. FC Köln in the Bundesliga.

She was a member of the Slovak national team. On 18 February 2021, Ondrušová became first Slovak women footballer, who reach 100 caps for Slovak national team, in a 4–0 win in a friendly match against Malta.

Career statistics

Career honours

Club
Neunkirch
Nationalliga A (1): 2017
Swiss Women's Cup (1): 2017

Bohemians Prague
Czech Women's Second League (1): 2012–13

Sparta Prague
Czech Women's First League (5): 2007–08, 2008–09, 2009–10, 2010–11, 2011–12
 Czech Women's Cup (5): 2007–08, 2008–09, 2009–10, 2010–11, 2011–12

References

External links
 
 
 

1988 births
Living people
Women's association football midfielders
Slovak women's footballers
Slovakia women's international footballers
ŠK Slovan Bratislava (women) players
AC Sparta Praha (women) players
FK Bohemians Prague (Střížkov) players
FC Neunkirch players
FC Basel Frauen players
Serie A (women's football) players
Hellas Verona Women players
1. FC Köln (women) players
Slovak expatriate footballers
Slovak expatriate sportspeople in the Czech Republic
Expatriate women's footballers in the Czech Republic
Slovak expatriate sportspeople in Switzerland
Expatriate women's footballers in Switzerland
Slovak expatriate sportspeople in Italy
Expatriate women's footballers in Italy
Slovak expatriate sportspeople in Germany
Expatriate women's footballers in Germany
Swiss Women's Super League players
Frauen-Bundesliga players
Czech Women's First League players
FIFA Century Club
Footballers from Bratislava